Minoru Higa (born September 18, 1941) is the Kaicho or federation president and Grandmaster of the Kyudokan School of Shorin-ryū. His efforts, along with that of his family, have made Kyudokan popular outside Okinawa.

Early life 
Master Minoru Higa 10th dan, nephew of Yuchoku Higa and Jintatsu Higa, was born in Naha, Okinawa on September 18, 1941. His first experience of martial arts (Judo) was at the age of 11, under the guidance of  Yogen Tamashiro. In 1960 he became the pupil of the Yokomoto Isekichi and began practicing karate with his uncle Yuchoku Higa.

The same year he enrolled in the Japan Bodybuilding Center, driven by his passion for weight-training. From 1960 onwards Minoru Higa  attended the famous temple of judo, the "Kodokan", attaining the grade of 4th Dan in this discipline.

His physique, which he developed through weight-training and intense practice of judo and karate, helped Higa to become the university boxing champion.

In 1964, he graduated in Business and Economics.

Karate life and Spread of the Kyudokan 
Following a special invitation in 1969, Minoru Higa put on a display at the Tokyo Budokan, for the Japanese Karate Championships; in 1971 he opened his gymnasium, the Naha Bodybuilding Center (today known as "Naha Gym"), whilst continuing his karate training under the guidance of his uncle Yuchoku Higa, at the Kyudokan Hombu Dojo.

In 1976, he became a member of the Ryukyu Kobudo Ryu Kon Kai, presided over by Kotaro Iha.

In 1977, together with his teacher Yuchoku Higa, he was invited to visit Argentina by the Shorin Ryu Kyudokan Federation (presided over by Jintatsu Higa), of that country for the Argentinian championships of Okinawa Kyudokan karate-do. During this period, some of the displays put on together with Yuchoku Higa, Jintatsu Higa, Oscar Higa and Benito Higa helped spread the name of the Higa family school.

Presidency of the Kyudokan 
As he was Vice-President of the Okinawa Kyudokan karate-do Federation, Minoru Higa decided to devote himself more fully to the growth of the school, and following the death of Yuchoku Higa, he himself became president of the World Okinawan Shōrin-ryū Kyudokan karate-do Federation, an office he holds to this day.

As well as being a prominent entrepreneur and world representative of the Kyudokan school, Minoru Higa is a committee-member for the Okinawan Karatedo and Kobudo Federation, vice-president of the Ryukyu Kobudo Ryu Kon Kai Association, chief committee-member of the Okinawa Bodybuilding Association, a member and referee for the Japanese Bodybuilding Federation, and a member and referee for the Japanese Powerlifting Association.

In November 1998 he visited Italy for the first time as a guest of honour, accompanied by other eminent masters, in order to preside over and contribute, with displays and training sessions, to the international competitions of Shōrin-ryū Kyudōkan Karatedo, hosted in Palermo by the Italian affiliate of the school.

In April 2010 he was invited by Kyoshi 8th dan Patrick Rault, (international expert of Kyudokan dojo, federal expert of the French Karate federation FFKDA, Kyudokan "all France official representative " www.kyudokan.fr ), to France to lead seminars in Paris and Canet en Roussillon, he also participated to the Famous Budo demonstration called Paris Bercy and shown the Kata Jion, his wife Noriko demonstrated a famous Okinawan traditional dance, a group of Kyudokan members composed of people from Germany, Poland, USA and France demonstrated Neihanshi Shodan.

Notes and references

1941 births
Living people
People from Naha
Japanese male karateka
Shōrin-ryū practitioners